Night Work is a 2006 novel by Austrian writer Thomas Glavinic. The book was translated into English in 2008 by John Brownjohn for Edinburgh-based publisher Canongate.

Plot summary
The novel, set in modern-day Vienna, is a post-apocalyptic exploration around themes of solitude and existential philosophy.

The plot concerns a central character, Jonas, who wakes up one day to discover that everyone else has vanished from the city, perhaps the world, without trace; he appears to be the only person left.

As he attempts to discover what could possibly explain such a situation, the days pass and he begins to realise that he is performing strange activities when asleep. A struggle ensues as Jonas tries to control his unconscious actions while he continues to search in vain for other human life.

Critical reception
The UK edition received a generally positive reception from critics. The Guardian referred to the book as being “at times genuinely horrific” because of the author’s skill in manipulating the “reader's constant anxiety that [he] won't, indeed can't, deliver a solution to his own mystery”. The Independent claimed that the novel, “functions both as an outstanding fictionalisation of Freud's essay The Uncanny, and as a superior literary thriller packed with invention and suspense”. The Scotland on Sunday said it was “strong on intrigue” and “seriously frightening”.

References

External links
  Thomas Glavinic and Night Work, Canongate website
 Night Work, Thomas Glavinic official website (German) 
 Night Work, Hanser website (German) 

2006 novels
Austrian novels
German-language novels
Novels set in Vienna
Post-apocalyptic novels
Canongate Books books
21st-century Austrian novels